The Third Fleet was a reserve formation of the Royal Navy that briefly existed before the First World War.

History
Formed on 1 May 1912 from the 4th Division of the Home Fleet, its elderly ships were ordinarily only manned by a small maintenance crew during peacetime, but were intended to be manned by naval reservists when mobilised. It was conducting a test mobilisation in July 1914 as tensions increased between Great Britain and Imperial Germany and was only partially demobilised before full mobilisation was ordered on 2 August. At this time it consisted of the 7th and 8th Battle Squadrons of pre-dreadnought battleships and five squadrons of cruisers.

Vice-Admiral Commanding

Components
Included

Footnotes

Bibliography

External links

Fleets of the Royal Navy
Military units and formations established in 1912
Military units and formations established in 1914
1912 establishments in the United Kingdom
Military units and formations of the Royal Navy in World War I